The WWWA World Martial Arts Championship was a secondary women's professional wrestling title in All Japan Women's Pro-Wrestling in the 1990s. This title was contested under kickboxing rules.

Title history

Footnotes

See also

 List of professional wrestling promotions in Japan
 List of women's wrestling promotions
 Professional wrestling in Japan

References

External links
WWWA World Martial Arts title history

All Japan Women's Pro-Wrestling Championships
Women's professional wrestling championships
Kickboxing